Ankarvattnet is a lake in Strömsund Municipality, Jämtland county, Sweden.

See also
List of lakes in Sweden

Lakes of Jämtland County